Raquel Yvette Lee is an American actress who appeared on Nickelodeon's The Amanda Show during the show's first season. She was replaced by Josh Peck. From 2001 to 2005, she also provided the voice of Nubia Gross on The Proud Family, and does so again on its revival series The Proud Family: Louder and Prouder in 2022. She also co-starred with Tahj Mowry, Mark Curry and Dawnn Lewis in the Disney Channel original movie The Poof Point. Lee has a daughter born in 2016.

Filmography

References

External links

 

Living people
Actresses from Los Angeles
African-American actresses
American child actresses
American film actresses
American television actresses
American voice actresses
Year of birth missing (living people)
20th-century American actresses
21st-century American actresses
20th-century African-American women
20th-century African-American people
21st-century African-American women